José Guilherme Guidolin Pegorari (born 12 July 1991), commonly known as Pegorari, is a Brazilian footballer who plays as a goalkeeper for Juventude.

Club career
Born in Americana, São Paulo, Pegorari joined Palmeiras' youth setup in 2007, from hometown side Rio Branco-SP. On 22 May 2012, he was loaned to Oeste for the remainder of the Série C.

On 7 January 2013, Pegorari moved on loan to Bragantino until the end of the 2013 Campeonato Paulista. On 17 December, he returned to the club, also on loan.

In May 2014, Pegorari was loaned to Guarani until the end of the year. On 9 May 2015, shortly after his loan expired, he signed a permanent deal with the club.

Pegorari was a regular starter for Bugre during the 2016 Campeonato Paulista Série A2, and moved to third division side Portuguesa on 31 May of that year. On 10 November, after the latter's relegation, he signed for Linense.

On 18 May 2018, Pegorari agreed to a deal with Botafogo-SP, but was only a backup option. He signed a contract with Ituano on 6 November, and immediately became a regular starter for his new club.

On 15 August 2019, Pegorari renewed with Ituano until December 2020, and was loaned to Série B side Figueirense for the remainder of the year. Upon returning to his parent club, he was again a first-choice, and further extended his contract until 2023 on 5 August 2020.

On 4 August 2022, Pegorari signed a deal with Série A side Juventude until December 2023. He made his debut in the top tier two days later at the age of 31, starting in a 1–0 home loss against América Mineiro.

Career statistics

Honours
Ituano
Campeonato Brasileiro Série C: 2021

References

External links

1991 births
Living people
Sportspeople from Paraná (state)
Brazilian footballers
Association football defenders
Campeonato Brasileiro Série A players
Campeonato Brasileiro Série C players
Campeonato Brasileiro Série D players
Villa Nova Atlético Clube players
Coimbra Esporte Clube players
Associação Atlética Internacional (Limeira) players
Esporte Clube Vitória players
Goiás Esporte Clube players